En Nahud is a town in the desert of central Sudan. Formerly located within the Sudanese political division of West Kurdufan, it is now part of the country's North Kurdufan state.

History 
In 2021, the Darsaya gold mine in the town collapsed, leading to the deaths of at least 38 people.

Climate
En Nahud has a hot desert climate (Köppen climate classification BWh).

Transportation
It is served by En Nahud Airport.

References

Populated places in North Kurdufan